The Trofeo Álava is a basketball friendly competition held in Vitoria-Gasteiz, Basque Country by the local team, Baskonia. It is held in the preseason, usually around late August to early September.

After an agreement was signed by the Provincial Council of Álava and Saski Baskonia in 1990, the tournament was set to be played under the name "Trofeo Diputación Foral de Álava", and it would serve as an introduction between the season's team and the fans. It featured Baskonia and two other teams, usually having a Liga ACB team and an international team have a round-robin tournament to determine the overall winner. From 1996 onwards, the format changed to a single game tournament, and has remained like that ever since. In 2018, the name "Trofeo Álava / Araba Saria" was adopted, but it is still commonly referred to as Trofeo Diputación by Baskonia fans.

The tournament has been held every year since 1991, with the exceptions of 1998, as the expansion works for the Araba Arena were being carried out during the months when the tournament was played, and 2020, caused by the COVID-19 pandemic. Out of the 30 times it has been contested, Baskonia has won it 27 times.

Results

References 

Saski Baskonia
1990 establishments in Spain
Basketball competitions in Spain